Sarah Ourahmoune (born 21 January 1982) is a French former female boxer. She won a silver medal at the Rio Olympics in 2016 before she retired from boxing.

Life
Ourahmoune was born in 1982 in Sèvres. She is of Algerian descent.

She won a silver medal at the 2016 Summer Olympics in Rio de Janeiro, in the women's flyweight. She was beaten by Nicola Adams who was the Olympic champion from the previous Olympics. The fight was won on points with Ourahmoune being chosen in only one round. Ourahmoune had announced her retirement before the match.

References

External links
 
 
 

1982 births
Living people
French women boxers
Olympic boxers of France
Boxers at the 2016 Summer Olympics
Olympic silver medalists for France
Olympic medalists in boxing
Medalists at the 2016 Summer Olympics
People from Sèvres
French sportspeople of Algerian descent
Sportspeople from Hauts-de-Seine
Flyweight boxers
AIBA Women's World Boxing Championships medalists